Tirap is a river in Arunachal Pradesh in India.

References 

Rivers of Arunachal Pradesh
Tirap district
Rivers of India